The azure tit (Cyanistes cyanus) is a passerine bird in the tit family Paridae. It is a widespread and common resident breeder throughout Russia and Central Asia and northwest China, Manchuria and Pakistan.

It is found in temperate and subarctic deciduous or mixed woodlands, scrub and marshes. It is resident, and most birds do not migrate. It nests in a tree hole, laying about 10 eggs. The bird is a close sitter, hissing and biting when disturbed. Its food is insects, seeds, small invertebrates, larvae of bugs, and eggs.

This 12–13 cm bird is unmistakable. The head, tail corners, wing bars and underparts are white. There is a dark line through the eye, and the upperparts are blue.

This is the eastern counterpart of the common Eurasian blue tit. It will hybridise with that species, but the offspring usually show a blue crown, rather than the white of azure tit. The calls are similar to blue tit, calling  or a scolding .

Taxonomy
For many years the azure tit was known as Parus cyanus.  In 2005, analysis of the mtDNA cytochrome b sequences of the Paridae indicated that Cyanistes was an early offshoot from the lineage of other tits, and more accurately regarded as a genus rather than a subgenus of Parus.

The azure tit not infrequently hybridizes with the blue tit in western Russia; the resulting birds are called Pleske's tit (Cyanistes × pleskei) and were once considered a distinct species.

The population in central Asia, yellow-breasted tit (C. c. flavipectus or Parus flavipectus), is sometimes included as a subspecies of the azure tit.

Gallery

References 

Harrap, Simon & Quinn, David (1996): Tits, Nuthatches & Treecreepers. Christopher Helm, London. 

azure tit
Birds of Russia
Birds of Eurasia
azure tit